Vandroid is a 2014 album by Busy P, Mr Flash, Feadz, Krazy Baldhead and 40106 (aka Mickey Moonlight). It is the soundtrack to the comic book of the same name. It was released on Ed Banger Records.

Track listing
 Krazy Baldhead - Start
 Mr Flash - Acceleration 
 Busy P - C.O.N.T.R.O.L
 Feadz - Repair
 Feadz - Party
 40106 - Sex Machine
 Krazy Baldhead - Romance
 Mr Flash - Memories
 Mr Flash - Payback
 Krazy Baldhead - Destruction
 40106 - Time Is Running Out
 Feadz - Humanity
 Mr Flash - Battle
 Busy P - Fermeture

Written by Nick Demetris Nicola, P. A. Grison, G. Bousquet, Pavle Kovacevic P. Winter, F. Pianta, F. Falke and Mike Silver
Produced by P. A. Grison, G. Bousquet, Pavle Kovacevic, Pedro "Busy P" Winter, F. Pianta, J. Mattar and Mickey Moonlight

Origins and development

The concept behind Vandroid is that of a 1980s sci-fi action movie that never was, together with an accompanying early-synth soundtrack. Tommy Lee Edwards, Noah Smith, Dan McDaid and Nick Demetris Nicola teamed up to create a comic book adaptation of the lost movie, and Nick Demetris devised the synth score. Yuksek, Van She, Fred Falke, Boy 8-Bit and Siriusmo were invited to remix some of the tracks from the soundtrack. Following the release of the remixes, the full Vandroid soundtrack album was released by Ed Banger Records.

References

External links
Vandroid official site
Vandroid at Ed Banger Records
Vandroid at Discogs
Vandroid at AllMusic

2014 albums
2014 soundtrack albums
Electronic albums by French artists